The houses at 28–36 Beacon Street in Somerville, Massachusetts are a series of Queen Anne style brick rowhouses.  The five identical houses were built c. 1880 on land formerly part of a brickyard owned by George Wyatt, whose own house stands across the street.  The facade of each house is divide vertically into two sections: the left one is flat, and is topped by a square turret roof, with a single story portico sheltering double entrance doors, and the right sight is a polygonal project bay rising the full three stories.  The shallow roof cornices are studded with brackets.

The rowhouses were listed on the National Register of Historic Places in 1989.

See also
National Register of Historic Places listings in Somerville, Massachusetts

References

Houses on the National Register of Historic Places in Somerville, Massachusetts